

List of Boulés

References

grand boulés
Zeta Phi Beta